European comics are comics produced in Europe.  The comic album is a very common printed medium. The typical album is printed in large format, generally with high quality paper and colouring, commonly 24x32 cm (9.4x12.6 in), has around 48–60 pages, but examples with more than 100 pages are common. While sometimes referred to as graphic novels, this term is rarely used in Europe, and is not always applicable as albums often consist of separate short stories, placing them somewhere halfway between a comic book and a graphic novel. The European comic genres vary from the humorous adventure vein, such as The Adventures of Tintin and Asterix, to more adult subjects like Tex Willer, Diabolik, and Thorgal.

History
The roots of European on-paper comics date back to 18th century caricatures (mocking others styles or behaviors) and illustrated picture books such as Wilhelm Busch's Max and Moritz. The early 19th century Swiss artist Rodolphe Töpffer is regarded by many as the "father of the modern comic" and his publication Histoire de M. Vieux Bois is sometimes called the first "comic book". Franco-Belgian comics, Spanish comics, and Italian comics are historically amongst the dominant scenes of European comics.

Earlier, paintings, depicting stories in subsequent frames, using descriptive text resembling bubbles-text, were used in murals, one such example written in Greek, dating to the 2nd century, found in Capitolias, today in Jordan.

Festivals
A number of festivals celebrating comic art are held around Europe.  These include:

 Amadora BD, Portugal
 Angoulême International Comics Festival, France
 Fumetto International Comics Festival, Lucerne, Switzerland
 Helsinki Comics Festival, Finland
 International Comics Festival "Salon stripa", Serbia
 International Festival of Comics and Games, Poland
 The Lakes International Comic Art Festival, Kendal, United Kingdom
 Lille Comics Festival, France
 Lucca Comics & Games, Italy
Heroes Comic Con, Spain
Salón Internacional del Comic, Spain

See also
 Franco-Belgian comics
 British comics
 Czech comics
 Dutch Comics
 German comics
 Hungarian comics
 Italian comics
 Polish comics
 Portuguese comics
 Serbian comics
 Spanish comics

References

External links
 The European Comics Collection Introductory Exhibit, Michigan State University Libraries
 The Comic Art Collection Home Page, Michigan State University Libraries
 European Comics and Graphic Novels in English www.europeancomics.net 
 Translated European Comics ratings www.European-comics.com 

 
European culture